was a Japanese merchant and engineer in the Edo period.

Gohei was born to a family of money-changers in Kaga province.

Coastal shipping
Gohei was put in charge of developing a coastal shipping fleet (kitamae ships) for the Tokugawa shogunate; and he became very rich from trading, especially rice and lumber.

Land reclamation project
In the summer of 1851, Gohei attempted a land reclamation project in Kahoku Lake, which is south of Kanazawa on the Sea of Japan.  He planned to create rice paddies; but the project failed.

In mid-1852, a large number of dead fish floated to the surface of the inlet near the worksite; and some local people died after eating the dead fish. Gohei and his family were deemed responsible; and they were imprisoned. It is likely that these criminal charges were contrived as a subterfuge which enabled the clan to seize his considerable wealth.

The eighty-year-old Gohei died within three months of his incarceration.

Notes

References
 Nussbaum, Louis Frédéric and Käthe Roth. (2005). Japan Encyclopedia. Cambridge: Harvard University Press. ; OCLC 48943301
 Sansom, George Bailey. (1963). A History of Japan, 1615-1867.] Stanford: Stanford University Press. ;

Further reading
 Wakabayashi, Kisaburo. (1957).  Osaka: Sōgensha. OCLC 033644769

External links
  Zeniya Gohei Memorial Museum
  Gohei and Kitamae ships 
 IMDb, Zeniya Gohei (1913) Zeniya Gohei (1913)

1773 births
1852 deaths
Japanese businesspeople